The Kenya women's national under-18 basketball team is a national basketball team of Kenya, governed by the Kenya Basketball Federation (KBF).
It represents the country in international under-18 (under age 18) women's basketball competitions.

See also
Kenya women's national basketball team
Kenya men's national under-18 basketball team

References

External links
Kenya Basketball Records at FIBA Archive

Basketball in Kenya
Basketball teams in Kenya
Women's national under-18 basketball teams
Basketball
Women's sport in Kenya